The Cullum Mansion is a historic mansion in Carthage, Tennessee.

Location
The mansion is located at 609 Cullum Street in Carthage, a small town in Smith County, Tennessee. It sits upon a hill close to the main street of Carthage.

History
The mansion was completed in 1848. It was designed in the Greek Revival architectural style. It was built for William Cullom [Cullum], who served in the United States House of Representatives from 1851 to 1855 as a member of the Whig Party.

It was purchased by Judge J. T. Fisher in 1898. It was then acquired by Glen Womack in 1925, and by W. W. Chambers in 1926. Four decades later, in 1966, it was purchased by Chesley Richardson, followed by Joel F. Maggart.

Architectural significance
It has been listed on the National Register of Historic Places since January 4, 1983.

References

Houses in Smith County, Tennessee
Houses on the National Register of Historic Places in Tennessee
Greek Revival houses in Tennessee
Houses completed in 1848
Antebellum architecture
National Register of Historic Places in Smith County, Tennessee